is a Japanese landscape garden and nationally designated Place of Scenic Beauty in the city of Hirakawa, Aomori Prefecture, Japan.

Overview
In the Oishi Bugaku Ryu style of Japanese gardens, it incorporates a large pond, with standing and stepping stones, and stone bridges reminiscent of Momoyama period garden layouts. This building is a Meiji-period fusion of Japanese and Western architectural styles, with an octagonal turret, a faux marble pillar in the tokonoma, and tatami floors.

In 2002, the Place of Scenic Beauty designation was expanded by 2100 square meters to encompass the intake weir that led to the pond and the surrounding forest area.

The Seitō family claims descent from Seitō Morihide, a retainer of Hōjō Tokiyori in the Kamakura period. According to legend, Hōjō Tokiyori had an affair with a lady-in-waiting named Karaito Gozen. This incurred the wrath of his wife, and fearing for Karaito Gozen's safety, he entrusted her to Seitō Morihide with orders to hide her in a distant location with promises that they would eventually be reunited. Seitō Morihide took her to distant Tsuruga by sea, to a village in what is now Fujisaki, Aomori. However, after years went by, Karaito Gozen feared that Hōjō Tokiyori had a change of heart and she committed suicide by throwing herself in a pond. Unable to face Tokiyori, Seitō Morihide decided to remain in Tsugaru. His descendants became great landholders. In the Meiji period, Seitō Moriyoshi served as village mayor and founded the Aomori Commercial Bank and Onoe Bank, and eventually became president of Onoe Bank. The garden remains in the hands of his descendants, but is open to the public.

See also
 List of Places of Scenic Beauty of Japan (Aomori)
 Seitō Shoin Teien

References

External links

 Seibi-en homepage 
 Aomori Prefectural Government 

Gardens in Aomori Prefecture
Hirakawa, Aomori
Places of Scenic Beauty
Buildings of the Meiji period
Giyōfū architecture